Lauriane Truchetet (born ) is a retired French female volleyball player, playing as a setter. She was part of the France women's national volleyball team.

She participated in the 2013 Women's European Volleyball Championship.
She competed at the 2013 Mediterranean Games. On club level she played for Terville Florange OC in 2013.

References

External links
http://br.scoresway.com/www.fc-wetter.de/?sport=volleyball&page=player&id=4218
http://www.cev.lu/Competition-Area/PlayerDetails.aspx?TeamID=8253&PlayerID=25331&ID=674
http://www.allianz-mtv-stuttgart.de/1-bundesliga/spielerinnen/spielbetrieb/Spielerin/lauriane-truchetet/details/
http://www.letelegramme.fr/volley/lauriane-truchetet-pile-la-defaite-face-la-victoire-28-03-2017-11452704.php
http://www.lalsace.fr/sport/2016/03/28/pas-de-coupe-pour-lauriane-truchetet
http://www.maritima.info/sports/volley-ball/actualites/istres/2940/volley-lauriane-truchetet-la-vie-en-bleu-mais-plus-en-rose-.html

1984 births
Living people
Sportspeople from Mulhouse
French women's volleyball players
Competitors at the 2013 Mediterranean Games
Place of birth missing (living people)
Mediterranean Games competitors for France